Keep the Faith: An Evening with Bon Jovi is a live concert that aired on MTV in late 1992 prior to the release of the band's then upcoming album Keep the Faith. The performance captures Bon Jovi in an intimate, "in the round" experience, performing acoustic and electric renditions of classic hits (Bon Jovi and non-Bon Jovi tracks), new material from Keep the Faith, and also behind the scenes footage.

The show took place at the Kaufman's Studios Astoria in Queens, New York City in 1992, and released commercially in 1993.

Track listing
 "With a Little Help From My Friends" (Lennon/McCartney)
 "Love for Sale" (Bon Jovi/Sambora)
 "Lay Your Hands on Me" (Bon Jovi/Sambora)
 "Blaze of Glory" (Bon Jovi)
 "Little Bit of Soul" (Bon Jovi/Sambora) 
 "Brother Louie" (Brown/Wilson)
 "Bed of Roses" (Bon Jovi)
 "Livin' on a Prayer" (Bon Jovi/Sambora/Child)
 "Fever" (Davenport/Cooley)
 "We Gotta Get Out of This Place" (Mann/Weil)
 "It's My Life" (Roger Atkins, Carl D'Errico)
 "Wanted Dead or Alive" (Bon Jovi/Sambora)
 "I'll Sleep When I'm Dead" (Bon Jovi/Sambora/Child)
 "Bad Medicine" (Bon Jovi/Sambora.Child)
 "Keep the Faith" (Bon Jovi/Sambora/Child)

Band Personnel

 Jon Bon Jovi (lead vocals, guitar, piano, percussion)
 Richie Sambora (guitar, backing vocals)
 David Bryan (keyboards, piano, backing vocals)
 Alec John Such (bass, double bass, backing vocals)
 Tico Torres (drums, percussion, backing vocals on 'Love for Sale')

Available on the following formats
VHS
Laserdisc
CDi

Additional information
 The song "It's My Life" performed at this concert is a cover of a song by The Animals, not the Bon Jovi song of the same name, as it was not written/released until 2000.
 The song "Baby What You Want Me to Do" was also performed at this concert and is a cover of Jimmy Reed's hit song. You will hear this song in the MTV television-aired version of "An Evening with Bon Jovi", though the song "Brother Louie," a cover of the Hot Chocolate hit song, is missing in the MTV broadcast.
 Actually this is a mix of two shows: from October 24 and October 25. More songs that were played which were cut out: You Give Love a Bad Name, I'll Be There for You, Blood on Blood, Fields of Fire, Heartbreak Hotel, and Good Lovin'.

Bon Jovi video albums
1993 video albums
1993 live albums
Live video albums